Admir Softić (born 14 May 1986) is a Bosnian retired professional footballer who played as a midfielder.

Playing career
Softić was born in Sarajevo. started his career with Cork City in Ireland in 2003, having moved there from his native country Bosnia and Herzegovina.

Softić had a successful time with Cork City's youth teams and that caught the eye of the senior manager who signed him as a full-time pro at the age of 17.

He made a handful of appearances for the first team during his time at Cork, which included three Champions League qualifier games against Apollon Limassol and Red Star Belgrade respectively. He only made a sub appearance against Apollon in Cyprus, while he played full 90 minutes against Red Star in both legs of the qualifiers.

Softić also won the FAI Cup '07 with Cork and lost two Cup finals (FAI Cup '05 and Setanta Cup '06) during his time there. In 2008, after Alan Mathews arrived as the new manager of Cork City, things did not look well for Softić. He only made one appearance in the League Cup against Cobh Ramblers and put in a transfer request in mid-July.

Softić left the club after five years and joined one of the biggest clubs in his native country, FK Željezničar in Sarajevo, but in the first month after arriving, he had a horrific injury, breaking his ankle in two places and was sidelined for the next five months.

He came back after the injury and finally made his debut in March 2009 away to FK Sloboda. After the season, he parted ways with the club and moved to Denmark where he was playing for Kolding FC, until January 2010. On 28 February 2010, Softić lined-out for Cork City in a pre-season match against Crosshaven FC. He also holds Irish citizenship, so he can play as communitarian in any EU country.

He then spent the next years in German lower league football, most prominently with fourth tier side TuS Koblenz. In January 2017 he joined German amateur side SC Vallendar.

Managerial career
After hanging up his boots, Softić became an academy coach at his last club he served as a player, TuS Koblenz.

References

1986 births
Living people
Footballers from Sarajevo
Association football midfielders
Bosnia and Herzegovina footballers
FK Sarajevo players
Cork City F.C. players
FK Željezničar Sarajevo players
Kolding FC players
NK SAŠK Napredak players
SV Wilhelmshaven players
TuS Koblenz players
League of Ireland players
Premier League of Bosnia and Herzegovina players
Danish 1st Division players
First League of the Federation of Bosnia and Herzegovina players
Regionalliga players
Oberliga (football) players
Bosnia and Herzegovina expatriate footballers
Expatriate association footballers in the Republic of Ireland
Expatriate men's footballers in Denmark
Bosnia and Herzegovina expatriate sportspeople in Denmark
Expatriate footballers in Germany
Bosnia and Herzegovina expatriate sportspeople in Germany